Jane Cannon Campbell (1 January 1743 - 1836) was an American Revolutionary War Patriot from Cherry Valley, New York.

Biography 
Campbell was born in the county of Antrim, Ireland. At the age of 10 she and her family left Ireland and settled in an area now part of the state of Delaware. The family farmed there for approximately 10 years before moving to an area near Cherry Valley, New York State. In 1767 she married Colonel Samuel Campbell.

Campbell was captured by the combined forces of British Captain Walter Bulter and the Mohawk Chief Joseph Brand during the Cherry Valley Massacre of November 11, 1778. She was held captive with her father, Matthew Cannon and four children first in the Seneca nation capital Kanadaseago, followed by over a year at Fort Niagara before being sent to Montreal for a prisoner exchange.

References 

1743 births
1836 deaths
People from Antrim, County Antrim
Irish emigrants to the United States (before 1923)